Louis Horne (born 28 May 1991) is an English footballer who plays as a defender.

Career
Horne was born in Bradford. He joined Bradford City's Centre of Excellence in 1999, and progressed through the club's junior teams until he received a first-team squad number during the 2008–09 season. He joined Barrow on loan in February 2009, and made his first competitive appearance in senior men's football, playing the whole of Barrow's 3–0 defeat away to Oxford United in the Conference, but the loan was cut short by Bradford a few days later. A versatile defender, Horne was named Bradford City's Youth Team Player of the Year for 2008–09.

Given his first professional contract before the 2009–10 season, Horne was an unused substitute on several occasions before making his Football League debut on 2 January 2010 in Bradford's 1–1 draw with Cheltenham Town, as a second-half substitute replacing Jamie O'Brien when the team was reorganised after Steve Williams was sent off.

In October 2010, Horne was signed on loan by Conference National side Fleetwood Town.

In August 2011, Horne signed for Hinckley United, but was released from the club in October 2011.

In December 2011, Horne signed for Andy Preece and his Northwich Victoria outfit after a short spell at Buxton, where he had made 7 appearances. He made his league debut for Northwich as an 86th-minute substitute for Lewis Short in a 2–1 victory over F.C. United of Manchester on 17 December 2011; this would prove his only appearance for the club.

In February 2012, Horne moved to Conference North side Vauxhall Motors in February 2012. He made his debut for Vauxhall Motors in a 2–1 loss at Gloucester City on 18 February 2012.

On 27 August 2012, Horne signed with Goole of the Northern Premier League Division One North. He would later sign with FC United of Manchester on 9 November 2012.

After this he played for Scarborough Athletic, Mossley, Goole and Ossett Albion.

He later joined Harrogate Railway Athletic. before in January 2016 moving to Frickley Athletic.

References

External links
  (Barrow stats)
  (Bradford City stats)

1991 births
Living people
English footballers
Association football defenders
Bradford City A.F.C. players
Barrow A.F.C. players
Fleetwood Town F.C. players
Hinckley United F.C. players
National League (English football) players
English Football League players
Buxton F.C. players
Northwich Victoria F.C. players
Northern Premier League players
Vauxhall Motors F.C. players
Footballers from Bradford
FC Halifax Town players
Goole A.F.C. players
F.C. United of Manchester players
Scarborough Athletic F.C. players
Mossley A.F.C. players
Ossett Albion A.F.C. players
Harrogate Railway Athletic F.C. players
Frickley Athletic F.C. players